Soleil Royal (Royal Sun) was a French 104-gun ship of the line, flagship of Admiral Tourville.

She was built in Brest between 1668 and 1670 by engineer Laurent Hubac, was launched in 1669, and stayed unused in Brest harbour for years. She was recommissioned with 112 guns and 1200 men when the Nine Years' War broke out in 1688  as the flagship of the escadre du Ponant (squadron of the West).

She was said to be a good sailing ship and her decorations were amongst the most beautiful and elaborate of all baroque flagships. The emblem of the "sun" had been chosen by Louis XIV as his personal symbol.

Career

Battle of Beachy Head
Soleil Royal was recommissioned with 112 guns and 1200 men when the Nine Years' War broke out. She departed Brest on 22 June 1690 as flagship of Anne Hilarion de Tourville. She spent three days in Camaret-sur-Mer waiting for favourable wind before sailing to Isle of Wight where the English fleet was thought to be anchored. Two ships sent in reconnaissance located the English anchored at Beachy Head.

The Battle of Beachy Head (known in French as "Bataille de Béveziers") began in the morning of 10 July 1690 when the French surprised the English ships anchored. Soleil Royal led the centre of the French formation.

Battle of Barfleur 
In 1692, on 12 May, now carrying 104 guns, she left Brest, leading a 45-vessel fleet; on the 29th, the squadron met a 97-ship strong English and Dutch fleet in the Battle of Barfleur. In spite of their numerical inferiority, the French attacked but were forced to flee after a large-scale battle resulting in heavy damage to both sides. The Soleil Royal was too severely damaged to return to Brest, and was beached in Cherbourg for repairs, along with the Admirable and Triomphant.

Battle at Cherbourg and the end of the Soleil Royal 

During the night of 2 and 3 June, beached at the Pointe du Hommet, she was attacked by 17 ships, which she managed to repel with artillery fire. However, a fireship set her stern on fire and the fire soon reached the powder rooms. Although the population of Cherbourg came to rescue, there was only one survivor among the 883 (or even 950)-strong crew.

The remains of the Soleil Royal now lie buried beneath a parking space next to the Arsenal.

Legacy 
 Soleil Royal became a traditional name for capital ships of the Ancien Régime, and several ships bore it afterwards.

A detailed 1/40th scale model of the hull and sculptures was built in 1839 by sculptor and modelist Jean-Baptiste Tanneron. This model is now on display at the Musée national de la Marine in Paris.

See also 
French ship Soleil-Royal for other ships of the name.
List of world's largest wooden ships

Notes and references

Notes

References

Bibliography 

  Navire de 1er Rang français
 

Ships of the line of the French Navy
Shipwrecks of France
1670s ships